Bridge in Hatfield Township is a historic stone arch bridge located at Unionville in Hatfield Township, Montgomery County, Pennsylvania. The bridge was built in 1874. The bridge crosses the west branch of Neshaminy Creek.

It was listed on the National Register of Historic Places in 1988.

References 

Road bridges on the National Register of Historic Places in Pennsylvania
Bridges completed in 1874
Bridges in Montgomery County, Pennsylvania
National Register of Historic Places in Montgomery County, Pennsylvania
Stone arch bridges in the United States